Syed Ashar Ahmed Zaidi (born 13 July 1981) is a Pakistani first-class cricketer. Zaidi is a left-handed batsman and left-arm orthodox spin bowler who is considered an all-rounder. He has played first-class cricket for Islamabad in Pakistan and for Sussex and Essex in England and has represented the Pakistan A cricket team at international level. He holds a British passport and as a result can play as a domestic player in England.

First-class career
Zaidi began his career playing for Islamabad Cricket Association in Pakistan. He appeared 88 times for the team between 1999 and 2010 and made appearances for other teams in Pakistan during the period. During the period between 2010 and 2013, he played club cricket in England for Accrington Cricket Club as well as appearing for Gazi Tank in the Dhaka Premier League in Bangladesh.

Zaidi joined Sussex County Cricket Club on non-contract terms towards the end of the 2013 season making two first-class appearances. Following the season, he signed a two-year contract with the club. During a County Championship match in September 2015, Zaidi was abused by English bowler Craig Overton whilst he was batting. Overton received a two match ban as a result of the incident. Zaidi later called on Overton to apologise for the abuse.

After making 19 first-class appearances for the county, Zaidi was released by Sussex at the end of the 2015 season before signing a one-year contract with Essex in January 2016.
He played a total of 65 games for Essex over three seasons, but was released at the end of 2018.

Franchise and T20 career

Bangladesh Premier League
Zaidi was selected by Comilla Victorians in the draft for the 2015 Bangladesh Premier League. He won the player of the tournament award, taking 17 wickets and scoring 215 runs as Comilla won the tournament. Zaidi's simple approach to both batting and bowling during the tournament was noted, although his performance was generally considered a surprise given his lack of Twenty20 experience prior to the tournament.

References

External links
 

1981 births
Living people
Pakistani cricketers
Essex cricketers
Sussex cricketers
Islamabad cricketers
Rawalpindi cricketers
Khan Research Laboratories cricketers
Federal Areas cricketers
Rawalpindi Rams cricketers
Islamabad Leopards cricketers
Pakistan Telecommunication Company Limited cricketers
Twelvers
Islamabad United cricketers
Comilla Victorians cricketers
Gazi Tank cricketers
Legends of Rupganj cricketers
Kala Bagan Cricket Academy cricketers
Cricketers from Karachi
Pakistani Shia Muslims